Rahavavy is a genus of Malagasy araneomorph spiders in the family Phyxelididae, and was first described by C. E. Griswold, H. M. Wood & A. D. Carmichael in 2012.  it contains only three species, found only on Madagascar: R. fanivelona, R. ida, and R. malagasyana.

See also
 List of Phyxelididae species

References

Araneomorphae genera
Phyxelididae
Spiders of Madagascar